Vivah is a 2006 Indian Hindi-language romantic drama film, written and directed by Sooraj R. Barjatya and starring Shahid Kapoor and Amrita Rao in the lead roles. The movie was produced and distributed by Rajshri Productions. Vivah tells the story of two individuals, and relates their journey from engagement to marriage and aftermath.

Vivah is the fourth film to feature Shahid Kapoor opposite Amrita Rao. The film was released on 10 November 2006, and became one of the biggest commercial successes of the year, grossing more than  worldwide. Critical reception was mixed; some reviewers found it dramatically lacking and bloated, but it also has been credited for triggering changes to the way marriage is depicted on film. It became an unexpected success, as well as Kapoor and Rao's biggest commercial success at that point.

Kapoor and Rao's performance in the film earned them a nomination for Best Actor and Best Actress respectively at the Screen Awards. Vivah is the first Indian film to be simultaneously released in cinema and on the internet (through the production company's official site). The film was also dubbed into Telugu and released as Parinayam.

Plot
Poonam, a middle-class girl lives in the small town Madhupur. Her parents died in her childhood and since then her uncle Krishnakant has fulfilled a father's void in her life. However, his wife Rama is jealous and unable to accept Poonam, driven by the fact that their own daughter Rajni is dark in complexion and less beautiful than Poonam. Despite this Rajni and Poonam grow close and consider themselves sisters. Harish Chandra Bajpayee, a renowned businessman in New Delhi has two sons: the married Sunil, and the soft-spoken and well-educated Prem.

Poonam's simple and affectionate demeanor impresses Bhagat, a jeweller and Krishnakant's friend, who takes her marriage proposal for Prem. Harish takes his opinion on the proposition. Hesitant, Prem feels he needs to focus on his career first. Harish convinces him to meet Poonam before deciding. Prem agrees. They visit the Mishras and let him get acquainted with Poonam. Prem and Poonam are instantly attracted to each other, agree to the marriage and get engaged.

Krishnakant invites Bajpayees to their summer place in Som Sarovar, so Prem and Poonam get to know each other better.
The two go through the most magical and romantic period of their lives, begin to fall in love and become attached. Later, Harish and his family return home to attend a business meeting urgently. Poonam and Prem communicate via telephone and letter. Prem joins the business and takes on an essential project in Japan.

Upon returning, the family brings Poonam as a surprise, and a celebration is held in honour of Poonam's first visit and Prem's successful business venture. During the celebration, an angry and jealous Rama hides in her room. Krishnakant finds her and angrily confronts her and calls her out on her refusal to accept Poonam despite her attempts throughout her life to win Rama's love. He informs her that she is the only person who has ever had a problem with Poonam. However, 2 days before the wedding, a fire breaks out at Mishra house. Although Poonam runs out in time, she realizes Rajni is still inside and saves her, but gets heavily burnt in the process. The doctor informs her father that in such cases, even families disown their own. Upon hearing that Poonam's diagnosis, and the fact that she was injured saving Rajni, a remorseful Rama breaks down realizing how cruel she has been to Poonam. Bhagatji, broken heartedly, calls Prem right as he is leaving for Madhupur for the ceremony. As he is about to sign the waiver allowing her surgery, he begins to cry and cannot do so. Prem arrives, determined to marry Poonam despite her injuries and bringing the finest doctors from Delhi. He marries her informally before her surgery. With the aid of the doctors from Delhi, the hospital successfully performs surgery on Poonam. Later, Poonam and Prem are traditionally married and go home to their new life. At their wedding night, Prem takes the initiative of dressing Poonam's burns. Then the film ends with a kiss and beginning of their married life.

Cast

The cast is listed below:

Shahid Kapoor as Prem Bajpayee, Poonam's husband and Sunil's younger brother
Amrita Rao as Poonam "Bitto" Mishra Bajpayee, Prem's wife
Anupam Kher as Harishchandra Bajpayee, Prem and Sunil's father
Alok Nath as Krishnakant Mishra, Poonam's uncle and Chhoti's father
Seema Biswas as Rama Mishra: Krishnakant's wife and Chhoti's mother
Samir Soni as Sunil Bajpayee, Prem's elder brother and Bhavna's husband
Lata Sabharwal as Bhavna Bajpayee, Sunil's wife and Prem's sister-in-law
Manoj Joshi as Bhagatji, Krishnakant's friend
Amrita Prakash as Rajni "Chhoti" Mishra, Krishnakant and Rama's daughter
 Ameya Pandya as Rahul Bajpayee, Sunil and Bhavna's son
 Dinesh Lamba as Munim
 Mohnish Bahl as Dr. Rashid Khan (extended cameo appearance)
 Yusuf Hussain in a friendly appearance as Dr. Jain

Production
Director/writer Sooraj Barjatya noted that the story of Vivah is based upon a newspaper article his father read in 1988. Like in all of Sooraj R. Barjatya's previous films, the male lead is called Prem. The story combined elements of Hindu tradition to set itself up as a film of cultural significance and was constructed differently than Barjatya's earlier films. Barjatya hoped that the film would be remembered as the first to tackle the definitions and dynamics of a marriage. In an interview with Times of India Barjatya said, he kept in mind all the novels of Saratchandra Chatterjee while making Vivah. Barjatya felt that the film should possess a lyrical feel, since it was, according to him, "a lyrics oriented film."

Filming took place during the first months of 2006. The main hurdle came up with the location. Barjatya wanted to shoot film in an authentic way. He asked the film's art director Sanjay Dhobade to create the entire town of Madhupur that can give a realistic look, particularly portions where water leaking takes place and portions where spit marks were visible on the walls of the buildings in the film. Later, the town was created in film city, Mumbai. Outdoor session of the film was done in Delhi, Lonavla, Ranikhet, Nainital and Almora.

Additional production credits include: Jay Borade – dance choreographer, Sound — Jitendra Chaudhary, Dialogue — Aash Karan Atal, Cinematography — Harish Joshi and Editor — V N Mayekar. Amrita Rao's costumes were created by Indian designer Anna Singh and Shahid Kapoor's clothes were created by Shabina Khan. To promote the film, Shahid Kapoor and Amrita Rao sold tickets at the Fame Theatre in Malad, Mumbai.

Soundtrack

The soundtrack (songs and the background score) and lyrics for Vivah was scored by Ravindra Jain. Vivah was seventh collaboration of Ravindra Jain with Rajshri Productions. It was produced under the Saregama label. The composer primarily gave special importance to "taal" and opted to keep two "antras" followed by a "mukhra" in the songs. The orchestra combines with classical Indian instruments, like the sitar, sarod, violin, dholak and tabla to produce a blend between classical western and classical Indian music. The complete film soundtrack album was released on 26 September 2006.

Although the songs were appreciated, the music was criticised due to its monotony choice of instruments and music arrangements being very similar to one another. Rediff.com wrote in its music review that, "Vivahs music disappoints". Nofil of Glamsham gave the album 2.5 out of 5 stars and noted that, "The music of Vivah fails to emerge as successful as other Rajshri family potboilers, Maine Pyar Kiya,  and Hum Saath-Saath Hain."

Reception
Kapoor and Rao's performance in the film earned them a nomination for Best Actor and Best Actress respectively at the Screen Awards.

Box office
Vivah premiered on 10 November 2006 across India. Like Hum Aapke Hain Koun..! (1994), Rajshri Productions released limited number of prints for the film and eventually increased prints with increasing popularity. Early reviewers of Vivah predicted that it would be a huge disappointment. The film opened well and went on to become a commercially successful venture.

The film earned  net gross after seven weeks of running. Vivah was released by Rajshri Media Limited on the production company's official site. The film's DVD was released by Rajshri Production.

Critical response
Ron Ahluwalia of Planet Bollywood gave it 7.5 out of 10 wrote, "Sooraj Bartjatya comes up with the best, cheesiest family flick we’ve seen in a long time without sending us back to the 1940s." Deepa Gahlot of Sify said, "Vivah is far less offensive and far more watchable." Nikhat Kazmi from The Times of India called it a "simple documentation of something as banal as an engagement to a vivah".

Madhuparna Das of The Telegraph criticised Vivah for lacking plot, flat characters and mentioning that the story was "rather weak and improbable." BBC described Vivah as "a didactic, worthy, and highly sanitised take on reality in keeping with the Rajshri tradition." Rajeev Masand of CNN-IBN gave only 1 out of 5 stars and condemned the screenplay, calling both Kapoor and Rao "insipid and boring." A review carried by Anupama Chopra mentioned, "Sooraj Barjatya's fantasy world is carefully constructed, but his conviction infuses his films with an emotional heft."

Influence
Indian painter M. F. Husain, decided to create a series of paintings inspired by Amrita Rao and Vivah. He planned to create an entire exhibition around her. He organised a private screening for 150 friends and press attendees to "convey his interest for the film" at Dubai's Plaza cinema. The Regent, a theater in Patna, Bihar, put up a festive banner to promote the movie. The banner reads Poonam weds Prem. Vivah inspired couples at that time to emulate the protagonists.

References

External links
 Official website 
 Official site at Rajshri Productions
 
 
 
 

2006 films
2000s Hindi-language films
2006 romantic drama films
Indian romantic drama films
Films about Indian weddings
Films set in Delhi
Rajshri Productions films
Films shot in Uttarakhand
Films shot in Delhi
Films directed by Sooraj Barjatya
Films scored by Ravindra Jain